Mykola Mykhaylovych Hayduchyk (born 30 December 1999) is a Ukrainian professional footballer who plays as a forward for Ukrainian club Veres Rivne.

Club career 
Hayduchyk is a product of DYuSSh Berezne, Veres Rivne, and Lviv youth sportive school systems.

In spring 2018, he moved to Malynsk, where he played in the Rivne Oblast Championship and the Ukrainian Amateur League. In the 2019 and 2020 seasons, he was the best goalscorer of the Rivne Oblast championship. In 2020, he played for ODEK Orzhiv in the Rivne Oblast championship and in the Ukrainian Amateur League.

In January 2021, he went back to Veres Rivne for a trial, as a result of which he signed a contract with the club. He made his Veres debut on 3 March 2021, in a home defeat in the quarter-finals of the 2020–21 Ukrainian Cup against Zorya Luhansk. Mykola came on in the 83rd minute, replacing Robert Hehedosh.

References

External links

 

1999 births
Living people
People from Zdolbuniv
Ukrainian footballers
Ukrainian Premier League players
Ukrainian First League players
Ukrainian Amateur Football Championship players
FC ODEK Orzhiv players
NK Veres Rivne players
FC Uzhhorod players
Association football forwards
Sportspeople from Rivne Oblast